The , signed as Route S1, is one of the routes of the Shuto Expressway system serving the Greater Tokyo Area. It primarily connects central Tokyo to the Tōhoku Expressway and points further north such as Sendai and Aomori.

Route description

The speed limit is 60 km/h for the first  of the route between Kōhoku Junction and the Kaga exit and entrance. From the Kaga exit and entrance north to Kawaguchi Junction the speed limit is 80 km/h.

History
The Kawaguchi Route was opened on 9 September 1987 alongside a section of the Central Circular Route. Upon opening, the expressway formed the first of many links between the expressways of northern Honshu to the expressways of the rest of the island and Kyushu. On 25 December 2002 access at Kōhoku Junction was extended to westbound traffic on the Central Circular Route.

On 20 July 2008, a project was completed on the Kawaguchi Parking Area to give its facilities a face-lift, add greenery, and to increase the size of its parking lot.

Junction list
PA= Parking area, TB= Toll booth

References

C2
1987 establishments in Japan
Roads in Saitama Prefecture
Roads in Tokyo